The Port Muhammad Bin Qasim ( Bandar-gāh Muhammad bin Qāsim), or Qasim Port Authority, also known as Port Qasim, is a deep-water seaport in Karachi, Sindh, Pakistan, on the coastline of the Arabian Sea under the administrative control of the Secretary to the Government of Pakistan for Maritime Affairs.  It is Pakistan's second busiest port, handling about 35% of the nation's cargo (17 million tons per annum). Port Qasim and Karachi Port, the busiest port of country, together handle more than 90% of all external trade of Pakistan.

The port encompasses a total area of  wherein many industrial zones operate. In addition to the Pakistan Steel Mills (PSM) and KESC Bin Qasim Power Plant, around 80% of the Pakistan's automotive industry is located at Port Qasim. The port also provides direct waterfront access to two major nearby industrial areas, Export Processing Zone (Landhi) and Korangi Industrial Area. Approximately 60% of country's export and import is originated from these areas. Port Qasim is managed by Port Qasim Authority, a semi-autonomous government body.

History

In the 1970s, as a part of Pakistani Prime Minister Zulfiqar Ali Bhutto's program for economic reforms and establishment of heavy industries, country's first steel mill (Pakistan Steel Mills) was established near the southern city of Karachi. A purpose-built specialised port facility was also decided to be established for bulk handling of the massive imports of raw materials for steel production by the Pakistan Steel Mill of Pakistan. In addition to the future economic demands and strategic needs, this port was also meant to relieve congestion at the only seaport Karachi Port of the country. This port was named as Port Muhammad bin Qasim (also known as Port Qasim), after the Muslim general Muhammad bin Qasim who conquered Daybul and the coastal areas of Sindh around 712 CE.

Location

Port Qasim is located, adjacent to the Bin Qasim town, in the southern part of Malir district, Karachi division, in Sindh. It is located in an old channel of the Indus River at a distance of 35 kilometres east of Karachi city center.

The geographic position of the Port Qasim places it in close proximity to major shipping routes.

Location of the Port Qasim makes it very well connected to the transportation infrastructure of the country. It is at distance of only 15 km from the national highway, providing direct access to the hinterland through road.  A further 14 km of railway track inside the terminal links it to the national railway network through 6 railway tracks.  Jinnah International Airport is also very near, at a distance of 22 km.

Port Qasim's residential area is a neighbourhood of Bin Qasim Town of Karachi.

Land allocation for port and industrial zones

The total area of the port comprises 3,520 acres (14.2 km2) with an adjacent 8,700 acres (35 km2) industrial estate. Port Qasim has been divided into three main zones as following:

Terminal facilities

Currently Port Qasim is offering following facilities:

Night navigation facilities are available at the port, handling up to vessels of LOA 202 meters during night.

Expansion projects
Port Qasim has planned for a major expansion in coming years with FDI of US$1.22 billion approximately.
Major expansion projects of the port are as following:

Integrated cargo container control (IC3) facility
The country's first Integrated Cargo Container Control (IC3) facility is being constructed at Port Qasim with a joint investment over US$8 million by Pakistan Customs and the US Customs and Border Protection.

The purpose of the IC3 programme is to enhance international maritime trade security considering post 9/11 security issues. The IC3 programme envisages joint screening of US-bound containerised cargo from Pakistan via live video link by the customs authorities of Pakistan and the US. The US Customs will not subject the screened cargo to re-examination on arrival at US ports. This facility will support trade in terms of reduced time and cost of shipments.

Environmental issues

Mangrove forest
Port Qasim is located on the northwest edge of the Indus Delta system. The system is characterised by long and narrow creeks, mud flats and the Indus River Delta-Arabian Sea mangroves, one of the largest mangrove forest ecosystems found in an arid climate. In 1972 eight species of mangrove trees were recorded from Pakistan, however, only four continue to thrive. Several species of reptiles, birds, and terrestrial mammals inhabit the project area, wherever suitable habitats are found. These are constantly under threat due to increased shipping and industrial activities in the area.

WWF Pakistan has taken a mangrove conservation initiative recognising the social, ecological and economic significance of the mangrove forests in the coastal areas of Sindh and Balochistan. As a part of this, initiative has been taken on conservation of the mangrove ecosystem in the Korangi – Phitti Creek system, in the Indus Delta (including Port Qasim area). The project aims to conserve selected degraded mangrove forests in the Korangi – Phitti creek area through involvement of community, local schoolchildren and other stakeholders like Port Qasim Authority and the Government Forest Department.

Tasman oil spill 2003 at Karachi Beach
In August 2003, the beach immediately west of the Port Qasim navigation channel was the scene of a major oil spillage when the Greek-registered Tasman Spirit ran aground. The environmental impact included large numbers of dead fish and turtles and a key mangrove forest, as well as dozens of people suffering nausea. At that time, it was feared that this incident will harm the coastal life in the Port Qasim area, however no major impact was observed near the Phitti Creek (waterway entrance to Port Qasim).

Pollution-free terminal 
Recently Port Qasim Authority (PQA) has announced that an implementation agreement is being signed for the development of a 'pollution-free' Coal, Cement and Clinker Terminal (CCCT) worth $175 million with a handling capacity of up to eight million tons per year at port. This step would save the environment from irreparable damages and the health of the port workforce and nearby populations from serious respiratory diseases which would have been a serious threat if the powdery coal was handled in open/bulk on berths at port.

See also 
 List of ports in Pakistan
 Port of Karachi
 Port of Gwadar
 Keti Bandar
 List of seaports
 Bin Qasim Town
 Buddo Island
 Bundal Island
 Port Qasim Authority
 Port Qasim Authority cricket team
 Ministry of Maritime Affairs (Pakistan)

References

External links
 Port Qasim Authority
 Pakistan National Shipping Corporation
 Pakistan Board of Investment
 Port Qasim Location Map

Ports in Karachi
Ports and harbours of Pakistan
Coastal cities and towns in Pakistan
Bin Qasim Town
Ministry of Maritime Affairs (Pakistan)